SM City Naga is a shopping mall owned and operated by SM Prime Holdings, the largest mall owner and operator in the Philippines. The mall is located in Central Business District II, Brgy. Triangulo, Naga City, the largest city in the province of Camarines Sur, in the Philippines. It is the first SM Supermall in the Bicol Region and the first SM Supermall to open in 2009. The mall opened its doors to the public on May 1, 2009.

Mall features
SM City Naga, the very first SM Supermall in Bicol Region comes in with new and innovative building design template that other SM Malls don't have. The mall's sleeker design was made possible by combining blue and white colors for the exterior of the main building with a touch of green colored tower-like bricks on the faćade that holds the SM logo on both sides, thus maintaining its natural identity as a shopping destination. A circular atrium that extends outside the building features a high curtain glass wall, for anybody to be able to see mall's activity inside. Because of the mall's limited lot space, a carpark building than can accommodate as many as 2,000 cars was constructed at the back portion of the mall and is directly connected to the main building.

Tenants
SM City Naga is anchored by The SM Store and SM Supermarket. It also has SM Supermalls junior anchors and retail affiliates such as SM Appliance Center, Watsons, BDO, and ACE Hardware. it also has a mix of Local, National, and International Retail Brands, Restaurants, and service vendors

Gallery

See also
SM City Legazpi
SM City Lucena
SM City San Pablo

References

Shopping malls in Naga, Camarines Sur
Shopping malls established in 2009
SM Prime
Shopping malls in Bicol Region